Maryland is a 1940 American drama film directed by Henry King. It stars Walter Brennan and Fay Bainter.

Plot

After her husband dies, wealthy Charlotte Danfield sells off his entire stable of horses, and forbids son Lee to ride again.

He remains close to trainer William Stewart, though, and upon returning from Europe, where he has been sent to school, Lee decides to ride William's horse Cavalier in the Maryland Cup over his mother's objections.

Cast
Walter Brennan as William Stewart
Fay Bainter as Charlotte Danfield
Brenda Joyce as Linda
John Payne as Lee Danfield
Charles Ruggles as Dick Piper
Hattie McDaniel as Aunt Carrie
Marjorie Weaver as Georgie Tomlin
Sidney Blackmer as Spencer Danfield
Ben Carter as Shadrach
Ernest Whitman as Dogface
Paul Harvey as Buckman
Spencer Charters as Judge

References

External links

1940 films
1940 drama films
20th Century Fox films
American drama films
Films directed by Henry King
Films set in Maryland
American horse racing films
1940s English-language films
1940s American films